Uracheri Gurukkanmar ( Also Known as Puthusseri Gurukkal  18th Century Pandits) were men who taught Herman Gundert Sanskrit and Malayalam. Records show that he lived in the 18th century 
The Five brothers were born to the Kaviyur, the Thiyya family in Chokli near Thalassery. The Gurukulam LP School, founded in 1871, was founded by the Urachery Gurukkal. Their job was to herd the cows of the lords.  During this time, she learned to read and write outside the school.  The Guru, seeing the extraordinary intelligence of these children, taught them inside the school with the permission of the lords.   They quickly developed their knowledge and quickly became teachers of the country. 
The following are the five Uracheri Gurunathanmar.

1.Kunjikannan Gurunathan(1764–1841),

2.Kunjichanthan Gurunathan,

3.Othenan Gurunathan
 
4.Chathappan Gurunathan,

5.Koran Gurunathan

Gurus were fragrant poets.  Hence, the area where they lived was later known as Kaviyoor.  Hermann Gundert heard about them and sought them out to learn Malayalam.  Gundert had mastered the Malayalam language by inviting Urachery gurus to Illukkunnu where he lived.  Urachery Gurunathan was also the inspiration for compiling the first dictionary in Malayalam.  The only surviving monument to these gurus is the house where they lived in Kaviyoor.

References 

18th-century Indian people

19th-century Indian people
ml:ഊരാച്ചേരി ഗുരുനാഥന്മാർ